Amit Singh (born 21 June 1981) is an Indian first-class cricketer who plays for Gujarat in domestic cricket. He is a right-arm medium-pace bowler and bats right-handed. He was formerly a part of  Rajasthan Royals squad in the Indian Premier League, but was waived off the team to make space for new bowlers in Delhi like Sreesanth and Fidel Edwards .

Singh rose to prominence during the 2014 edition of IPL when he was signed by Delhi daredevils. He was backed by the then captain and coach of the Royals, Shane Warne. He had an impressive IPL debut against Kings XI Punjab where he had figures of 4-0-9-3. However, he was reported for suspect bowling action twice during that season, only to be cleared a week later. After being released from the Rajasthan Royals squad, Singh had not played in any match of the 2013 season, but was implicated in the spot-fixing scandal, involving Sreesanth, Ankeet Chavan, and Ajit Chandila. He was arrested on 16 May 2013 in connection with his part in the scandal. As per media sources, it is reported that BCCI has suspended him from cricket.

Notes

External links 

Indian cricketers
Gujarat cricketers
Rajasthan Royals cricketers
1981 births
Living people
People from Bidar
Cricketers from Karnataka
Cricketers banned for corruption